The O'Sullivan River is a tributary of Lake Waswanipi, which is crossed on the North by the Waswanipi River (the James Bay drainage). The O'Sullivan River flows North into the Abitibi Regional County Municipality, and into Eeyou Istchee James Bay (municipality), in the Nord-du-Québec, in Quebec, in Canada.

The course of the O'Sullivan River crosses the townships of Charrette, Adhémar, Labrie, Ralleau, Ruette, Benoit, Duplessis and Bossé.

Geography 
The surrounding hydrographic slopes of the O'Sullivan River are:
 north side: Lake Waswanipi, Waswanipi River;
 east side: Wetetnagami River, Mégiscane River;
 south side: Louison Lake, Delestres River;
 west side: Mossant Creek, Lecompte River, Robin River (Parent Lake).

A little unnamed lake is the headwater body of the O'Sullivan River. This head lake obtains some 15 small lakes upstream and nearby.

From the small head lake, the O'Sullivan River flows over:
 northwesterly to a south discharge;
 northerly to the south shore of Lake Waswanipi that the current flows through on  then merge to the current of Waswanipi River.

Toponymy
The natives used the name "Pusticamica" to designate this watercourse.

At the request of the Commission de toponymie du Canada, the name "Rivière O'Sullivan" has been attributed to evoke the work of life of Henry O'Sullivan (Sainte-Catherine-de-Fossambault], 1845 - Loretteville, 1912). After studying at Laval University in 1869, O'Sullivan worked as a land surveyor, geologist and explorer in the Department of Lands and Forests. O'Sullivan explored much of Labrador, Gaspésie, all of Nord-du-Québec .

The toponym O'Sullivan River was formalized on December 5, 1968, at the Bank of Place Names of the Commission de toponymie du Québec.

Notes and references

See also 

Rivers of Nord-du-Québec
Nottaway River drainage basin
Abitibi Regional County Municipality